The Guy Lafleur Trophy is awarded annually to the Most Valuable Player in the Quebec Major Junior Hockey League playoffs.  It is named for Hockey Hall of Famer and QMJHL alumnus Guy Lafleur.

Winners

References

External links
 QMJHL official site List of trophy winners.

Quebec Major Junior Hockey League trophies and awards